Om Prakash Mishra is an Indian academic and politician. Currently he serves as Vice Chancellor of University of North Bengal.

Career

Om Praksh Mishra has started his career as a lecturer at Jadavpur University and before joining University of North Bengal he served as HOD of Department of International Relations, Jadavpur University. Dr. Mishra did his graduation from Balurghat College (Affiliated to University of North Bengal), MA and PhD in International Politics from Jawaharlal Nehru University, New Delhi, India.

References

 
 
 

Living people
Jawaharlal Nehru University alumni
Jadavpur University alumni
University of North Bengal alumni
Year of birth missing (living people)